Yrjö Uimonen (20 February 1932 – 11 June 1997) was a Finnish speed skater. He competed in the men's 500 metres event at the 1956 Winter Olympics.

References

1932 births
1997 deaths
Finnish male speed skaters
Olympic speed skaters of Finland
Speed skaters at the 1956 Winter Olympics